Aspleniineae is a suborder of ferns in the  order Polypodiales. It is equivalent to the clade eupolypods II in earlier systems; it is also treated as a single very broadly defined family Aspleniaceae. The suborder generally corresponds with the order Blechnales as described by J. L. Reveal in 1993. Aspleniineae includes some important ferns, including Onoclea sensibilis, the sensitive fern, which grows as a virtual weed throughout much of its temperate North American range, and ferns of the genus Thelypteris, a genus that has shown remarkable speciation. It also includes one of the more common horticultural ferns, Matteuccia struthiopteris, the ostrich fern.

Taxonomy
In the Pteridophyte Phylogeny Group classification of 2016 (PPG I), the group is treated as the suborder Aspleniinae, and divided into 11 families. Alternatively, it may be treated as a single, very broadly circumscribed family Aspleniaceae sensu lato, which is then divided into subfamilies. The relationship between the two approaches is shown in the table below.

Phylogenic relationships
The following diagram shows a likely phylogenic relationship between the families of Aspleniineae (as eupolypods II), based on Lehtonen  (2011), and Rothfels & al. (2012).

References 

Polypodiales